Class 19 may refer to:

 Caledonian Railway 19 Class, 0-4-4T steam locomotives
 Belgian Railways Class 19, electric locomotives
 British Rail Class 19, an experimental locomotive
 DRG Class 19,  2-8-2 express train, tender locomotives of the Deutsche Reichsbahn:
 DRG Class 19.0
 DRB Class 19.1
 DRB Class 19.10
 KTM Class 19, diesel-electric shunting locomotives

See also

 No.19 class minesweeper